Takatori Castle was a 14th-century Japanese castle, now in ruins, in Takatori, Nara Prefecture.

History 
Ochi Kunizumi built the original castle in 1332. The Ochi controlled the castle until the mid-16th Century, and during this time, it took part in several revolts as an important castle in the area. Takatori Castle was then abandoned by order of Oda Nobunaga in 1580, when he declared Kōriyama Castle the ruling castle in the region. Tsutsui Junkei began reconstruction of the castle in the year 1584, but died shortly afterwards. His heir Sadatsugu was also moved to Iga province the following year, and rebuilding the castle fell to Honda Tarozaemon with his son Toshitomo.  The Honda clan were lords of the castle until 1640, when Uemura Iemasa became the new lord. The Uemura clan then ruled until the Meiji Restoration.

Takatori Castle, together with Bitchu Matsuyama Castle and Iwamura Castle, is named one of the Three Great Mountaintop Castles. In its heyday, it was a huge, sprawling castle with 27 towers, impressive stone walls and several baileys for the residences of vassals.

Current site 
Currently only stone walls exist, and some of the gatehouses, which are used as residences, and one is used as a pharmacy.

Further reading

References

Castles in Nara Prefecture
Ruined castles in Japan